Talles Macedo Toledo Costa (born 2 August 2002), known as Talles Costa or simply Talles, is a Brazilian professional footballer who plays as a midfielder for São Paulo FC.

Club career
Born in São Paulo, Talles joined São Paulo FC's youth setup in June 2013, at the age of 11. He made his first team debut on 14 April 2021, starting in a 3–2 Campeonato Paulista home win against Guarani.

Career statistics

Honours

Club
São Paulo
Campeonato Paulista: 2021

International
Brazil U17
FIFA U-17 World Cup: 2019

References

External links
São Paulo FC profile 

2002 births
Living people
Footballers from São Paulo
Brazilian footballers
Association football midfielders
Campeonato Brasileiro Série A players
São Paulo FC players
Brazil youth international footballers